The 2015 German Figure Skating Championships was held on December 12–14, 2014 at the Eiswelt Stuttgart in Stuttgart. Medals were awarded in the disciplines of men's singles, ladies' singles, pair skating, and ice dancing. The results are part of the criteria used to choose the German teams to the 2015 World Championships and 2015 European Championships.

Medalists

Senior

Junior

Senior results
The Deutsche Eislauf Union published the list of entries in November 2014.

Men

Ladies

Pairs

Ice dancing

References

External links
 Deutsche Eislauf-Union
 2015 German Championships: Senior results
 2015 German Championships: Junior, youth, and novice results

German Championships
German Figure Skating Championships
Figure Skating Championships